Edwin Ekwevukugbe Etieyibo is a Nigerian-Canadian (Afro-Canadian) philosopher dedicated to advancing African philosophy. He is an advocate of the validity of ethnophilosophy. This view has been criticised by a number of scholars and philosophers who argue that traditional African philosophy and ethnophilosophy are not genuine philosophy. Etieyibo is a professor of philosophy and chair of the Department of Philosophy at the University of the Witwatersrand, Johannesburg, South Africa.
He is also an adjunct professor at the University of Alberta.

Early life and education 
Etieyibo was born in Adeje, Delta State, Nigeria, to Samuel Etieyibo and Idolor Etieyibo. He attended Amuane Primary School (Amuane), Ethiope Primary School (Amukpe-Sapele), Okpe Grammar School (Amukpe-Sapele) and Okotie-Eboh Grammar School (Sapele).

He studied in Nigeria, Canada and South Africa. He got admission to the University of Lagos, where he graduated in 1998 with a BA (first class honours) in philosophy (with minor in English and English Literature), an MA in 2001 (cum laude) in philosophy, and an MBA in 2015 (with a research focus on management, work ethics, and motivational theories).

In 2009, Etieyibo received his PhD from the University of Alberta working on the dissertation entitled, David Gauthier’s Moral Contractarianism and the Problem of Secession. His dissertation, under the supervision of Wesley Cooper, Adam Morton and externally examined by Jan Narveson, cuts across a number of disciplines including ethics, political philosophy, economics and decision theory and presents a critical examination of Gauthier’s account of morality that links rationality with preferences explained by expected utility.

In 2013, Etieyibo enrolled for an LLB degree at the University of South Africa and graduated in 2017, writing his portfolio/research essay on law, education and rights, with the title: “School Governing Bodies, Education Departments, and the Constitutionally Guaranteed Access to Education in South Africa.”

Work and research 

Etieyibo sees philosophy as liberatory both in form and content. He is among scholars and philosophers promulgating the notion of Africanising philosophy and the validation of ethnophilosophy. Ethnophilosophy has been criticized and defended by some scholars in various literature discourse and critiques. Some of the most forceful critiques of ethnophilosophy come from the prominent African philosopher, Paulin Hountondji.

Etieyibo was a member of the African Philosophy Society’s international steering committee for the third biennial African Philosophy World Conference in Dar es Salaam, Tanzania in 2019.

In 2018, he presented one of the keynote addresses at the biennial conference of the International Social Ontology Society in Boston, Massachusetts.

He currently serves as the Editor-in-Chief of the South African Journal of Philosophy, the Secretary/Treasurer of the International Society for African Philosophy and Studies and the Secretary of the African Philosophy Society — an organization for which he is a co-founder. He has been named the Association for Research on Civil Society in Africa (AROCSA) champion of the week.

His interests include, social and political philosophy, applied ethics, social and global justice, philosophy for children, African philosophy, African socio-political economy, epistemology, Descartes, rights and disabilities. This has been the focus of his research works in impacting and contributions to Africanising philosophy and the philosophy curriculum in ways that respond to different traditions of philosophy, especially the African philosophical traditions (also referred to as African philosophy) consistent with the demands of intercultural philosophy.

He is the co-author (with Odirin Omiegbe) of the monograph, Disabilities in Nigeria: Attitudes, Reactions, and Remediation published by Hamilton Books in 2017.

Etieyibo has written and co-authored several books as well as published in journal articles covering a number of diverse, interrelated areas such as: ethics, social and political philosophy, applied ethics, social and global justice, culture, rights and disabilities, social contract theories/and history of, African philosophy, African socio-political economy, epistemology, and Descartes.

Selected publications

Books 
 
 Co-authored with Odirin Omiegbe of the monograph.
  Edited

Book chapters 
 .
 .
 
 .
 .
 .
 .
 .
 .

Journal articles 
 .
 .
 .
 .
 .
 .
 .
 .
 . 
 . 
 .
 .
 .

References 

Living people
Date of birth missing (living people)
Nigerian philosophers
Year of birth missing (living people)
People from Delta State
Academic staff of the University of the Witwatersrand
University of Lagos alumni